The Kohanza Reservoir was a reservoir in Danbury, Connecticut. Construction was completed in 1866. It was the first of many reservoirs built to supply Danbury's hat factories. The dam broke on January 31, 1869. The ensuing flood of ice and water killed 11 people in half an hour, and caused major damage to many homes and farms, as well as uprooting trees and moving boulders.

The reservoir still exists in two smaller sections: Upper Kohanza Lake and Lower Kohanza Lake.

References

Reservoirs in Connecticut
Geography of Danbury, Connecticut
Lakes of Fairfield County, Connecticut